The 2004–05 Icelandic Hockey League season was the 14th season of the Icelandic Hockey League, the top level of ice hockey in Iceland. Four teams participated in the league, and Skautafelag Akureyrar won the championship.

Regular season

Final 
 Skautafélag Reykjavíkur - Skautafélag Akureyrar 1:3 (9:6, 2:6, 3:5, 1:7)

External links 
 2004-05 season

Icelandic Hockey League
Icelandic Hockey League seasons
2004–05 in Icelandic ice hockey